Dixey Rock is a rock rising  above sea level,  southeast of Darwin Island in the Danger Islands. It was mapped by the Falkland Islands Dependencies Survey in 1953–54 and 1956–58, and photographed from the air by the Falkland Islands and Dependencies Aerial Survey Expedition, 1956–57. It was named by the UK Antarctic Place-Names Committee in 1980 after David J. Dixey, Head of Nautical Branch 5 at the Hydrographic Department.

References 

Rock formations of the Joinville Island group